José Tapia (born 19 February 1905) was a Cuban football coach who managed Cuba in the 1938 FIFA World Cup, where they were eliminated in the quarter finals by Sweden in what was, to date, Cuba's only appearance in a FIFA World Cup.

References

1905 births
Year of death missing
People from San José de las Lajas
1938 FIFA World Cup managers
Cuban football managers
Cuba national football team managers